Pollard was a railway station on the Shelbourne line between the townships of Bradford and Nuggetty.
It was originally called Bradford Station.

There was a ticket office, shelter and toilets.

For the rest of its life, the station was out of use. It was at one time used as a flat-track for the manufacture of trains.
There were no sidings so goods trains would leave trucks behind at Pollard on the way back to Maldon for the next train to push them into Shelbourne and then to their intended destination.
Nothing remains of the station today, other than the platform mound.

References

Disused railway stations in Victoria (Australia)
Railway stations closed in 1970
Railway stations in Australia opened in 1891